Shuaphaenops parvicollis is a species of beetle in the family Carabidae, the only species in the genus Shuaphaenops.

References

Trechinae